Joseph West (6 January 1921 – 26 June 2000) was an Irish long-distance runner. He competed in the marathon at the 1952 Summer Olympics in Helsinki, Finland.

References

1921 births
2000 deaths
Athletes (track and field) at the 1952 Summer Olympics
Irish male long-distance runners
Irish male marathon runners
Olympic athletes of Ireland
Sportspeople from Cork (city)